Saint-Roman-de-Malegarde is a commune in the Vaucluse department in the Provence-Alpes-Côte d'Azur region in southeastern France.

Geography
On the edge of the Vaucluse, looking onto the border with the Drôme and dozing between Bollène and Vaison-la-Romaine, Saint-Romain-de-Malegarde is a former outpost of the order of the Knights Templar, built on the left bank of the Aygues on the northern border of the Comtat Venaissin.

Features
The top of the old village is built on a hill, where the streets are steep and narrow. The bottom of the village has absorbed new buildings such as the school and the mairie (town hall). Its parish church in the centre of the village dates back to the 13th century. Its façade is decorated with an 18th-century sundial and a Maltese cross. There is also the remains of an ancient 12th-century château. All that remains is three towers. The middle one is a troglodyte part of the former fortress.

Economy
Only a few hundred people live in the village all year round. Most of the inhabitants are wine-growers and cultivate appellation d'origine contrôlée (AOC) Côtes du Rhône vineyards.

See also
Communes of the Vaucluse department

References

Communes of Vaucluse